The 1975 WTA Tour consisted of a number of tennis tournaments for female tennis players. It was composed of the newly streamlined version of the Virginia Slims Circuit (which was now an 11-week tour of the US) and the Woman's International Grand Prix. The year 1975 also saw the creation of the first official ranking system and these rankings were used to determine acceptance into the tournaments.

Schedule 
This is a calendar of all events which were part of either the Virginia Slims circuit or the Women's International Grand Prix in the year 1975, with player progression documented from the quarterfinals stage. Also included are the Grand Slam tournaments, the 1975 Virginia Slims Championships, the 1975 Federation Cup and a number of events not affiliated with either tour.

Key

December (1974)

January

February

March

April

May

June

July

August

September

October

November

December

Statistical information 
These tables present the number of singles (S), doubles (D), and mixed doubles (X) titles won by each player and each nation during the 1973 Virginia Slims Circuit. They also include data for the Grand Slam tournaments and the year-end championships. The table is sorted by:

 total number of titles (a doubles title won by two players representing the same nation counts as only one win for the nation);
 highest amount of highest category tournaments (for example, having a single Grand Slam gives preference over any kind of combination without a Grand Slam title);
 a singles > doubles > mixed doubles hierarchy;
 alphabetical order (by family names for players).

Key

Titles won by player

Titles won by nation

Rankings 
Below are the 1975 WTA year-end rankings (November 4, 1975) Singles competition:

See also 
 1975 World Team Tennis season
 1975 Men's Grand Prix circuit

References 

 Australian Open Draws
 VS of San Francisco Draws
 VS of Washington Draws
 VS of Chicago Draws
 VS of Boston Draws
 VS of Houston Draws
 VS of Dallas Draws
 VS of Philadelphia Draws
 VS Championships Draws
 Family Circle Cup Draws
 West German Championships Draws
 Italian Open Draws
 French Open Draws
 Eastbourne International Draws
 Wimbledon Draws
 US Clay Court Championships Draws
 Medi-Quik Classic
 US Open Draws
 Little Mo Classic Draws
 Majestic Tournament Draws
 Mission Viejo Tournament Draws
 Thunderbird Classic Draws
 Orlando Open Draws
 French Indoors Draws

External links 
 Women's Tennis Association (WTA) official website
 International Tennis Federation (ITF) official website

 
WTA Tour
WTA Tour seasons